Technolibertarianism (sometimes referred to as cyberlibertarianism) is a political philosophy with roots in the Internet's early hacker cypherpunk culture in Silicon Valley in the early 1990s and in American libertarianism. The philosophy focuses on minimizing government regulation, censorship or anything else in the way of a "free" World Wide Web. In this case the word "free" is referring to the meaning of libre (no restrictions) not gratis (no cost). Cyber-libertarians embrace fluid, meritocratic hierarchies (which are believed to be best served by markets). The most widely known cyberlibertarian is Julian Assange. The term technolibertarian was popularized in critical discourse by technology writer Paulina Borsook.

Technolibertarian principles are defined as:
 The policy should always be considerate of civil liberties
 The policy should oppose government over-regulation
 The policy that provides rational, free market incentives is the best choice

Notable proponents
 Julian Assange
 John Perry Barlow
 John Gilmore
 T. J. Rodgers

See also
 The Californian Ideology
 Crypto-anarchism
 Libertarian transhumanism
 Technocracy
 Technocapitalism

References
Notes

Further reading
 

Philosophical schools and traditions
Political philosophy
Libertarianism in the United States
Libertarianism by form
Conservatism in the United States
 
Political systems
Right-libertarianism
Political neologisms
California culture
Libertarian theory
Politics and technology